Hitman: Agent Jun is a 2020 South Korean action comedy film directed by Choi Won-sub, starring Kwon Sang-woo, Jung Joon-ho, Hwang Woo-seul-hye, Lee Yi-kyung and Lee Ji-won. It was released on January 22, 2020.

Plot 
Secret agent Jun fakes his death to pursue his dream of becoming a webtoon artist. He keeps failing at comics until he starts writing and drawing about his former job, which draws the national intelligence agency to him.

Jun, who lost his parents from birth and lived as an orphan. The only talent he had was his excellent fighting skills and excellent drawing skills that even older middle school students could easily control. Then, one day, a man came to see Jun, and he followed the man and later became an agent of the National Intelligence Service who took the title of 'Elite Assassin'. However, his passion for cartoons still remained, to the point where he drew pictures in his spare time while doing his duty. However, as if drawing occasionally was not enough to achieve his true goal, Jun jumped out of a helicopter on a stormy night and disguised himself as if he had been in an accident, and the NIS, who does not know this, believes that he is really dead.

15 years later, Jun started a family and became a cartoonist the way he wanted to, but his dream and reality were different. His serialized comics were full of malicious comments because they weren't fun, and he was scolded by the editor for being late due to a slump. As a result, his actual livelihood was being subsidized by working hard at the construction site as a side job. Slowly getting sick of this situation, he does things he shouldn't have done. He drew a cartoon about his life as an agent while drunk, and the cartoon became a huge hit with the number 1 view. In the eyes of others, it was a very happy moment to finally escape from obscurity, but to Jun, it was a big advertisement of a top-level national secret, so the situation started to burn.

As expected, the comic book, which was a huge hit, caused anger. Jun's difficult but peaceful daily life is put to a halt as NIS agents find out that he is alive and terrorists are also entangled.

Cast

Main
 Kwon Sang-woo as Jun
 Jung Joon-ho as Deok-gyu
 Hwang Woo-seul-hye as Mi-na
 Lee Yi-kyung as Cheol
 Lee Ji-won as Ga-young

Supporting
 Heo Sung-tae as Hyung-do
 Jo Woon as Jason
 Heo Dong-won as Jerome
 Lee Jun-hyeok as Gyu-man
 Lee Joong-ok as Foreman
 Joo Seo-eun as Eun
 Oh Ja-hoon as Young-joon

Special appearances
 Kim Hee-min as situation room NIS agent
 Choi Yo-han as PC bang boss
 Han Chul-woo as helicopter pilot
 Lee Sang-won as Seong-tae
 Kim Gil-dong as Jason's subordinate
 Bae Jin-woong as Jason's subordinate
 Kim Seon-hyeok as NIS informant
 Park Doo-shik as Simon
 Kim Poong as himself
 Hwang Byung-gook as orphanage director

Production
Principal photography began on May 21, 2019, and filming ended on September 11, 2019.

Reception
The film surpassed 1 million moviegoers five days after its release.

As of May 19, 2020, the film has reached 2,406,232 total admissions grossing $16,814,256 in revenue.

References

External links
 
 
 

2020 films
2020s Korean-language films
2020 action comedy films
South Korean action comedy films
Films about the National Intelligence Service (South Korea)
Lotte Entertainment films